Kirk Anderson may refer to:
Kirk Anderson (judge) (born 1967), justice of the Supreme Court of Jamaica since 2011
Kirk Anderson (cartoonist), winner of the 2005 James Aronson Award
Kirk Anderson (As the World Turns), fictional character on American soap opera As the World Turns
The victim in England's 1977 Mormon sex in chains case